Heavy Hitters is a 2005 album of cover songs by the Michael Schenker Group. Originally planned by Schenker as a collection of covers featuring himself and a "revolving all-star cast of guest musicians," the album was labeled and marketed as an MSG album, with the result that Schenker received only a flat fee.

In 2008, it was re-released as a Michael Schenker solo album under the title Doctor Doctor: The Kulick Sessions and included four  additional tracks (1-2 and 13-14). A Deluxe Digital version of this release is available under the "Guitar Masters: The Kulick Sessions" title. This contains instrumental versions of all the songs on the album except 'Save Yourself'.  The album was re-issued again in 2011 with the title By Invitation Only by the Store For Music label, including the song "Run to the Hills", which Schenker and McAuley had recorded for the Iron Maiden tribute album Numbers from the Beast.

Track listing and instrumental contributions 
 "All Shook Up" (Otis Blackwell; Elvis Presley) - 4:21 (Elvis Presley cover)
 Joe Lynn Turner - vocals
 Michael Schenker - lead guitar
 Bob Kulick - rhythm guitar
 Jeff Pilson - bass
 Aynsley Dunbar - drums
 "Blood of the Sun" (Felix Pappalardi; Gail Collins Pappalardi; Leslie West) - 3:52 (Leslie West/Mountain cover)
 Leslie West - vocals
 Michael Schenker - lead guitar
 Bob Kulick - rhythm guitar
 Rudy Sarzo - bass
 Simon Wright - drums
 "Doctor Doctor" (Michael Schenker; Phil Mogg) - 6:07 (UFO cover)
 Jeff Scott Soto - vocals
 Michael Schenker - lead guitar
 Bob Kulick - rhythm guitar
 Jeremy Rubolino - keyboards, strings arrangements
 Marco Mendoza - bass
 Brent Chassen - drums
 "War Pigs" (Bill Ward; Geezer Butler; Ozzy Osbourne; Tony Iommi) - 7:24 (Black Sabbath cover)
 Tim "Ripper" Owens - vocals
 Michael Schenker - lead guitar
 Bob Kulick - rhythm guitar
 Mike Inez - bass
 Aynsley Dunbar - drums
 "I'm Not Talking" (Mose Allison) - 4:10 (Mose Allison cover)
 Mark Slaughter - vocals
 Michael Schenker - lead guitar
 Bob Kulick - rhythm guitar
 Jeff Pilson - bass
 Aynsley Dunbar - drums
 "Money" (Roger Waters) - 6:04 (Pink Floyd cover)
 Tommy Shaw - vocals
 Michael Schenker - lead guitar
 Edgar Winter - sax
 Tony Levin - bass
 Mike Baird - drums
 "Out in the Fields" (Gary Moore) - 4:25 (Gary Moore cover)
 Gary Barden - vocals
 Michael Schenker - lead guitar
 Bob Kulick - rhythm guitar
 Chuck Wright - bass
 Brent Chassen - drums
 "Hair of the Dog" (Dan McCafferty; Darrell Sweet; Manny Charlton; Pete Agnew) - 4:11 (Nazareth cover)
 Paul Di'Anno - vocals
 Michael Schenker - lead guitar
 Bob Kulick - rhythm guitar
 Phil Soussan - bass
 Vinny Appice - drums
 "I Don't Live Today" (Jimi Hendrix) - 3:54 (The Jimi Hendrix Experience cover)
 Sebastian Bach - vocals
 Michael Schenker - lead guitar
 Bob Kulick - rhythm guitar
 Tony Franklin - bass
 Eric Singer - drums
 "Politician" (Jack Bruce; Pete Brown) - 5:10 (Cream cover)
 Jeff Pilson - vocals, bass
 Michael Schenker - lead guitar
 Brent Chassen - drums

Track Listing from Doctor Doctor: The Kulick Sessions (2008 re-release) 
 "Save Yourself" (Robin McAuley; Michael Schenker) - 5:55 (with Robin McAuley)
 "Finding My Way" (Alex Lifeson; Geddy Lee) - 5:19 (Rush cover)
 Sebastian Bach - vocals
 Michael Schenker - lead guitar
 Bob Kulick - rhythm guitar
 Tony Franklin - bass
 Eric Singer - drums
 "All Shook Up"
 "Blood of the Sun"
 "Doctor Doctor"
 "War Pigs"
 "I'm Not Talking"
 "Money"
 "Out in the Fields"
 "Hair of the Dog"
 "I Don't Live Today"
 "Politician"
 "Doctor Doctor" - 6:16 (instrumental version)
 "War Pigs" - 7:25 (instrumental version)

Track Listing from Guitar Masters - The Kulick Sessions (Deluxe Digital Version)
 "Save Yourself" 
 "Finding my Way"
 "All Shook Up"
 "Blood of the Sun"
 "Doctor Doctor"
 "War Pigs"
 "I'm Not Talking"
 "Money"
 "Out in the Fields"
 "Hair of the Dog"
 "I Don't Live Today"
 "Politician"
 "Doctor Doctor" (instrumental version)
 "War Pigs" (instrumental version)
 "Hair of the Dog"  - 4.14 (Instrumental version) (Bonus Track)
 "I Don't Live Today" - 4.20 (Instrumental version) (Bonus Track)
 "All Shook Up"  - 4.26 (Instrumental version) (Bonus Track)
 "Money"  - 6.10 (Instrumental version) (Bonus Track)
 "Blood of the Sun" - 3.57 (Instrumental version) (Bonus Track)
 "Out in the Fields"  - 4.30 (Instrumental version) (Bonus Track)
 "I'm Not Talking"  - 4.16 (Instrumental version) (Bonus Track)
 "Politician"  - 5.49 (Instrumental version) (Bonus Track)

Track Listing from By Invitation Only (2011 re-release)
"Run to the Hills" (Steve Harris) - 4:05 (Iron Maiden cover)
Robin McAuley – lead vocals
Michael Schenker – lead guitar
Pete Fletcher – rhythm guitar
Tony Franklin – bass
Brian Tichy – drums
 "Save Yourself" 
 "Finding My Way" 
 "All Shook Up"
 "Blood of the Sun"
 "Doctor Doctor"
 "War Pigs"
 "I'm Not Talking"
 "Money"
 "Out in the Fields"
 "Hair of the Dog"
 "I Don't Live Today"
 "Politician"

Credits
Bob Kulick - producer, arrangements, mixing 
Brett Chassen - producer, engineer, mixing
Jeremy Rubolino - keyboards, strings production, digital editing
Bruce Bouillet, Bob Held, Billy Sherwood - engineers
Kris Solem - mastering
Brian Perera - executive producer

References

2005 albums
Michael Schenker Group albums
Cleopatra Records albums
Covers albums